Raphael Zon (December 1, 1874 - October 27, 1956) was a prominent U.S. Forest Service researcher.

Early life 
Raphael Zon was born in Simbirsk in the Russian Empire in 1874, to parents Gabriel Zon and Eugenia Berliner. A schoolmate of Lenin's, he fled Russia in 1896 while on bail following arrest for organizing a trade union. Zon and companion Anna Puziriskaya, whom he would later marry, fled to Belgium where he studied in Liège.
He spent nine months in London before emigrating to the United States in 1898.

Education 

Zon's early studies were in Russia. He attended the "classical gymnasium" in Simbirsk, and, studying "medical and natural sciences," graduating from the Kazan Imperial University with a bachelor's degree in "comparative embryology". In the United States, Zon studied forestry under Bernhard Fernow, Filibert Roth and others at the New York State College of Forestry at Cornell University in Ithaca, New York, earning a professional degree of Forest Engineer (F.E.) in the college's first graduating class in 1901.

Career 
Upon graduation, he went to work for the U.S. Forest Service, where his career spanned 43 years as a forest researcher. Zon was a protégé' of both Dr. Bernhard Fernow and Gifford Pinchot, first Chief of the United States Forest Service, and a close friend of Bob Marshall in the 1930s.

Zon made significant contributions to forestry literature. Many of his more than 200 scientific publications have been translated into Russian, French, German, and Japanese. With Bernard Fernow, Zon helped establish American forestry’s professional periodical literature. These contributions began when he joined the editorial staff of Forest Quarterly. He deepened his involvement, becoming editor of the Proceedings of the Society of American Foresters in 1905. When Forest Quarterly and Proceedings merged, Zon became one of the founders and the first managing editor of the combined publication, the Journal of Forestry. He served as editor-in-chief of the Journal of Forestry from 1923-28.

Zon was a "giant" among American foresters, or as Secretary of Agriculture Claude R. Wickard said, the "dean of all foresters of America."

Commemoration 

A large stone memorial with plaque commemorating Zon stands at the USDA Cutfoot Sioux Experimental Forest, in Minnesota, near where his ashes were scattered.

Career 
 1901. U.S. Forest Service Student Assistant and assistant to forest investigations in the East
 1907. Chief, Office of Silvics, later Forest Investigations
 1920. Special investigations in forest economics
 1923-1944. Director, Lakes States Forest Experiment Station, St. Paul, Minnesota
 1923-1928. Director, Cloquet Forest Experiment Station, University of Minnesota
 1944. Retired, U.S. Forest Service

Accomplishments 
 1908. Proposed the establishment of decentralized U.S. Forest Experiment Stations
 1914. Charter member, Ecological Society of America
 1918. National Research Council, Division of Agriculture, Botany, Forestry, Fisheries and Zoology Executive Committee
 1923-1928. Editor-in-chief, Journal of Forestry
 1928. International Congress of Soil Science, American vice president of the subcommision of forest soils
 1930. Charles Lathrop Pack Forest Education Board
 1940. New York World's Fair "Foreign-born citizens judged to have made the most notable contributions to American democracy in the past 100 years"
 Fellow, Society of American Foresters
 1952. Gifford Pinchot Medal, Society of American Foresters
 2005. U.S. Forest Service Centennial Congress Science Leadership Award
 Authored or co-authored roughly 200 articles in professional journals, business and development publications, or popular magazines

References

External links 
"A Red Star is Born." Peeling Back the Bark.
"The Greatest Good: 100 years," a video on the life and legacy of Raphael Zon, by Char Miller

Cornell University College of Agriculture and Life Sciences alumni
History of forestry in the United States
Forestry researchers
History of forestry education
American conservationists
American foresters
New York State College of Forestry
1956 deaths
1874 births
Kazan Federal University alumni
Emigrants from the Russian Empire to the United States